is a gallery commemorating the "imperial virtues" of Japan's Meiji Emperor, installed on his funeral site in the Gaien or outer precinct of Meiji Shrine in Tōkyō. The gallery is one of the earliest museum buildings in Japan and itself an Important Cultural Property.

On display in the gallery are eighty large paintings, forty in "Japanese style" (Nihonga) and forty in "Western style" (Yōga), that depict, in chronological order, scenes from the Emperor's life and times. The gallery opened to the public in 1926, with the final paintings completed and installed ten years later.

Background

In his brief survey of pre-Meiji Japanese imperial portraiture, surviving exemplars of which are known at least from the Kamakura period, Donald Keene writes that these "reveal very little individuality", eschewing realism "instead to convey courtly elegance or Buddhist consecration". A trend that lasted "well into" the nineteenth century, this was in part also an artefact of the artist typically not knowing what the emperor looked like. The earliest, extant though unpublished, photograph of the Meiji Emperor was taken late in 1871 at the Yokosuka Naval Yard. The next photographs were taken the following year, in response to a request by the Iwakura Mission, delegates having observed Western diplomats exchanging portraits of their respective heads of state. When Itō Hirobumi and Ōkubo Toshimichi briefly returned to Tōkyō, they were instructed to return with an official portrait; though they did not take the 1872 photographs, of the young Emperor in court dress, with them when they set off again for the US, the following year two new photographs, this time of the Emperor of Japan in Western dress, were taken and sent on to the Mission with the earlier pair (selected from the seventy-two taken at the first session). The final official photographs of the Emperor were taken later in 1873 after the return of the Mission, with the Emperor, his top-knot now cut off, in the Western military uniform that was to become his customary attire. These photographs were not widely distributed: when in 1874 someone in Tōkyō began selling unauthorized copies, after debate in government about the propriety of selling such, such sale was prohibited. Continuing to circulate nevertheless, the 16 April 1878 edition of the Yomiuri Shimbun featured a reported sighting of one hanging in a house of ill-repute in the Yoshiwara district, and it was not until 1898 that the official ban was lifted. In the meantime, commissioned by Hijikata Hisamoto, Chiossone's 1888  (pictured above) had come to be widely distributed in the form of reproductions, not least, though initially only upon request, to schools across the country, where it helped foster "patriotism and loyalty to the emperor". Around a dozen incidents have been catalogued, between the mid-1890s and 1947, of teachers risking their lives to save this portrait from tsunami, fire, earthquake, air raid, even theft. Such respect and reticence might be understood in the light of the Meiji Constitution, according to Article 3 of which "The Emperor is sacred and inviolable", as well as Itō Hirobumi's Commentaries on the Constitution, in which he observes that the Tennō should not be the subject of common talk.

The gallery
 

The Naien or inner precinct of Meiji Jingū was constructed between 1912 and 1920, supported by central government funds. In 1915, the Meiji Shrine Support Committee was established to raise funds for and plan the shrine's Gaien, or outer precinct. After a public competition in 1918, Kobayashi Masatsugu's design was the following year selected from the one hundred and fifty-six submissions received, Furuichi Kōi and Itō Chūta numbering amongst the judges. With some amendment by the shrine's building department, construction began in 1919 and ran until 1926, Ōkura Doboku, a legacy firm of what is now Taisei Corporation, starting their work in 1921. This was temporarily suspended due to the Great Kantō earthquake, after which the scaffolding was taken down and temporary barracks built to shelter victims, some 6,400 of whom were accommodated on the site. Construction resumed in May 1924. Internal finishing works began in 1925 and the building phase was completed late the following year. While Ōkura Doboku were responsible for most of the construction work and finishing, the materials were supplied by the government. Gravel was sourced from a government-owned direct collection site along the Sagami River, Asano Cement, a legacy firm of today's Taiheiyō Cement, provided the cement, and steel was brought at a heavily discounted rate from the government-owned Yahata Steel Works, the connecting railways and steamships carrying the loads at half the usual freight rate as their contribution to this important national project.

The interior takes the form of a spacious central hall, beneath the dome, clad in domestically-sourced marble (56% from Mino-Akasaka in Gifu Prefecture, the remainder from Ehime, Fukushima, Gunma, Okayama, Yamaguchi, &c) and with a marble and mosaic tiled floor; the two painting galleries open off to the sides, each with forty paintings, to the right the first forty nihonga, to the left the forty yōga. One of the earliest museum buildings in the country, the architecture, in which straight lines are emphasized, is "memorable, solid, and stately", and in June 2011 the gallery was designated an Important Cultural Property, for its "excellence of design" and "superior construction techniques", in particular those used in the shell dome and for the lighting the painting galleries, which are naturally lit from above.

Completed on 22 October 1926, the Gallery specially opened to the public for one day the following day, although at this point only five paintings had been dedicated, one nihonga, four yōga. From 1 October 1927 the Gallery was open on weekends and public holidays only. 21 April 1936 saw a special commemorative ceremony on the completion of the paintings and exactly one year later the Gallery opened to the public on a full-time basis. In December 1944 the Gallery closed due to the war situation. With the US Occupation, the Gallery was requisitioned by occupying forces (cf., the Bayreuth Festspielhaus), a state of affairs that continued until 1952. More recently, in 2005 2,200 glass plates from the time of construction were found in a gallery storeroom.

Painting topics

Discussion of which topics should be selected for the paintings began at committee level at the beginning of 1916 and, two years later, eighty-five possible subjects were selected, those rejected including Commodore Perry's Arrival at Uruga. Later in 1918 a panel of five began their research trips across Japan, to confirm suitability, document locations, and draft explanatory texts, amongst them , who prepared "provisional paintings". In 1921 the final eighty were proposed, and these were approved the following year. 

A recent analysis of the subject matter of the paintings has highlighted their range of topic (11 showing palace scenes, 10 grand politics, 11 diplomacy, 18 military, 8 economy, 4 education, 3 health, 3 religion, 1 transport, 5 "love for the people", the remainder cultural pursuits and/or visits to prominent figures), geographic setting (15 in Kyōto, 37 in Tōkyō, also Hokkaidō, Tōhoku, Kantō, Kinki, Chūgoku, Kyūshū, Okinawa, also Taiwan, Manchuria, Korea, Karafuto, and the US, as well as domestic waters and the high seas), and how neither Emperor nor Empress appear in a quarter of the paintings, the Emperor hidden in a further thirteen (the remainder: 15 Emperor standing (including 1 with the Empress), 12 sitting (including 2 with the Empress), 5 riding, 1 in a carriage, 8 the Empress (standing), 1 the Empress (hidden)).

The paintings
While there are eighty paintings, there are not quite eighty different artists, Kondō Shōsen and  responsible for two, and Kobori Tomoto for three. Tosa washi was selected as the official support for the paintings, although not all artists chose to use it.

Related plans and period photographs

See also
 Historiographical Institute of the University of Tokyo
 List of Important Cultural Properties of Japan (Taishō period: structures)
 List of museums in Tokyo
 Meiji no Mori Minō Quasi-National Park
 Meiji no Mori Takao Quasi-National Park

Notes

References

External links
  Meiji Memorial Picture Gallery
  The paintings arranged by month (Meiji Jingū Gaien)
  Gallery timeline (Meiji Jingū Gaien)

Art museums and galleries in Tokyo
Meiji period
Taishō period
Buildings and structures in Shinjuku
Art museums established in 1926
1926 establishments in Japan
Emperor Meiji
Neoclassical architecture in Japan
Art Deco architecture
Imperial Crown Style architecture